In Greek mythology, Syllis (Ancient Greek: Συλλίδος) was a Sicyonian nymph who mothered Zeuxippus by Apollo. Her son succeeded Phaestus as the king of Sicyon when the latter migrated to Crete. In some accounts, the mother of Zeuxippus was called Hyllis, daughter of Hyllus and Iole.

Notes

References 

 Pausanias, Description of Greece with an English Translation by W.H.S. Jones, Litt.D., and H.A. Ormerod, M.A., in 4 Volumes. Cambridge, MA, Harvard University Press; London, William Heinemann Ltd. 1918. . Online version at the Perseus Digital Library
 Pausanias, Graeciae Descriptio. 3 vols. Leipzig, Teubner. 1903.  Greek text available at the Perseus Digital Library.

Nymphs
Women of Apollo
Sicyonian characters in Greek mythology
Mythology of Sicyon